In mathematics, the Weber modular functions are a family of three functions f, f1, and f2, studied by Heinrich Martin Weber.

Definition

Let  where τ is an element of the upper half-plane. Then the Weber functions are

These are also the definitions in Duke's paper "Continued Fractions and Modular Functions". The descriptions as  quotients immediately imply

The transformation τ → –1/τ fixes f and exchanges f1 and f2. So the 3-dimensional complex vector space with basis f, f1 and f2 is acted on by the group SL2(Z).

Alternative infinite product

Alternatively, let  be the nome, 

The form of the infinite product has slightly changed. But since the eta quotients remain the same, then  as long as the second uses the nome . The utility of the second form is to show connections and consistent notation with the Ramanujan G- and g-functions and the Jacobi theta functions, both of which conventionally uses the nome.

Relation to the Ramanujan G and g functions

Still employing the nome , define the Ramanujan G- and g-functions as

The eta quotients make their connection to the first two Weber functions immediately apparent. In the nome, assume  Then,

For example, his identity,

leads to

For example, using , which are some of the square-free discriminants with class number 2,

and one can easily get  from these, as well as the more complicated examples found in Ramanujan's Notebooks.

Relation to Jacobi theta functions

The argument of the classical Jacobi theta functions is traditionally the nome  

with even-subscript theta functions purposely listed first. Using the well-known Jacobi identity with even subscripts on the LHS,

therefore,

Relation to j-function

The three roots of the cubic equation

Also, since,

and using the definitions of the Weber functions in terms of the Jacobi theta functions, plus the fact that , then

since  and have the same formulas in terms of the Dedekind eta function .

See also 

Ramanujan–Sato series, level 4

References

Notes

Modular forms